Darin Fane Shapiro (born October 25, 1973), nicknamed "The Scud" is an American professional wakeboarder from Orlando, Florida and the most successful rider in the history of the sport. Shapiro is well known for landing the first ever Double-flip on a wakeboard, which he named the "Speedball" as well as many other tricks which laid the foundation for what wakeboarding is today. After a 10-year retirement from wakeboarding, Shapiro returned to competition at age 40, at the 2014 Wake Games contest at Orlando Watersports Complex in Orlando, Florida.

Shapiro competed in his first pro contest on the island of Kauai at the age of 17.

Shapiro appeared in most major Wakeboard movies and influenced the development of the sport.  He is considered to be the first rider landing an Air Raley which was named after one of his coaches in Team Hyperlite, Chet Raley. The first signature board ever in the industry was named the "Shapiro Pro Model" from Hyperlite.

In the early days of the sport Shapiro was riding for Herb O'Brien who founded Hyperlite.  The noted that the "Hyperlite Pro" board was responsible for the tremendous growth of the sport and Shapiro contributed with his demonstrations of excellent riding.

Shapiro also surfs and is a musician.

Darin Shapiro was the first pro wakeboarder ever inducted into the Water Ski Hall of Fame 2010.

Darin Shapiro is a 12 time World Champion and led the sport of wakeboarding for nearly 20 years.

Tournament results

3x triple crown champ, 12 overall world titles, 3x X Games, gold, silver, bronze, Gravity games gold,
4x masters champ, 3x Nautique Big Air champ, approximately 70 pro tour wins, and is the most winning rider in the history of the sport.

Masters

See also
 Waterskiing
 Wakeboarding
 List of Water Skiing Hall of Fame Inductees

External links
 
 Official Page
 Ride The Spot
 The Wakeboard Site

References

1973 births
Living people
American wakeboarders
X Games athletes